Furovirus is a genus of viruses, in the family Virgaviridae. Graminae, winter wheat, wheat, triticale, oat, sorghum bicolor, and plants serve as natural hosts. There are six species in this genus. Diseases associated with this genus include: (SBWMV): green and yellow mosaic.

Taxonomy
The following six species are assigned to the genus:
 Chinese wheat mosaic virus
 Japanese soil-borne wheat mosaic virus
 Oat golden stripe virus
 Soil-borne cereal mosaic virus
 Soil-borne wheat mosaic virus
 Sorghum chlorotic spot virus

Structure
Viruses in the genus Furovirus are non-enveloped, with rod-shaped geometries, and helical symmetry. The diameter is around 20 nm, with a length of 260-300 nm. Genomes are linear and segmented, around 3.5-3.6kb in length.

Life cycle
Viral replication is cytoplasmic. Entry into the host cell is achieved by penetration into the host cell. Replication follows the positive stranded RNA virus replication model. Positive stranded rna virus transcription is the method of transcription. Translation takes place by suppression of termination. The virus exits the host cell by monopartite non-tubule guided viral movement. Graminae, winter wheat, wheat, triticale, oat, sorghum bicolor, host, and  plants serve as the natural host. The virus is transmitted via a vector (fungus). Transmission routes are vector.

References

External links
 ICTV 1Oth Report Virgaviridae
 Viralzone: Furovirus
 ICTV
 

Virgaviridae
Viral plant pathogens and diseases
Virus genera